Hammedi is a town and commune in Boumerdès Province, Algeria. According to the 1998 census it has a population of 27,972.

Notable people

 Mohamed Cherak, Algerian journalist.

References

Communes of Boumerdès Province
Boumerdès Province